The 1911 Cleveland Naps season was a season in  American major league baseball. It involved the Cleveland Naps attempting to win the American League pennant and finishing in third place (22 games back). They had a record of 80 wins and 73 losses.

The Naps played their home games at League Park II.

Regular season

Addie Joss 
Addie Joss, the ace starting pitcher for the Naps, experienced fainting spells while training for the 1911 season. He died of tubercular meningitis on April 14, at his home in Toledo, Ohio, leaving behind his wife and two young children. Joss's funeral took place on April 17 in Toledo, when the Naps were scheduled to play the Detroit Tigers. The players declared their intention to strike if the game that day was not postponed. Though American League president Ban Johnson initially did not agree, he cancelled the game. Several Tigers players attended the funeral as well.

Charles Sommers, the owner of the Naps, began to plan the Addie Joss Benefit Game, which was held at League Park in Cleveland on July 24, a mutual off day for all teams in the American League. An all-star team played against Cleveland, defeating the Naps by a score of 5-3. In total, nine players from the game were later inducted into the National Baseball Hall of Fame: Cy Young and Nap Lajoie for Cleveland, Walter Johnson, Ty Cobb, Eddie Collins, Tris Speaker, Sam Crawford, Home Run Baker, and Bobby Wallace for the all-stars. The game raised $12,914 for Joss's widow ($ in current dollar terms); the sum was more than double Joss's annual salary.

Season highlights 

In his rookie season, Shoeless Joe Jackson hit .408, which ranked second in the American League. He also finished in the league top 10 in home runs, RBI, runs scored, and stolen bases. Jackson was fourth in the Chalmers MVP Award voting.

Vean Gregg led the starting pitchers of the team in several categories: he had a total of 23 wins and seven losses; he pitched 244⅔ innings, yet maintained a league-leading 1.80 ERA, while striking out 125 batters.

Young, 44 years old at the time, played part of his final season with the 1911 Cleveland Naps team.

Season standings

Record vs. opponents

Roster

Player stats

Batting

Starters by position
Note: Pos = Position; G = Games played; AB = At bats; H = Hits; Avg. = Batting average; HR = Home runs; RBI = Runs batted in

Other batters
Note: G = Games played; AB = At bats; H = Hits; Avg. = Batting average; HR = Home runs; RBI = Runs batted in

Pitching

Starting pitchers
Note: G = Games pitched; IP = Innings pitched; W = Wins; L = Losses; ERA = Earned run average; SO = Strikeouts

Other pitchers
Note: G = Games pitched; IP = Innings pitched; W = Wins; L = Losses; ERA = Earned run average; SO = Strikeouts

Awards and honors

League top ten finishers 
Vean Gregg
 MLB leader in ERA (1.80)
 #2 in AL in shutouts (5)
 #4 in AL in wins (23)
 #8 in AL in complete games (22)

Shoeless Joe Jackson
 MLB leader in on-base percentage (.468)
 #2 in AL in batting average (.408)
 #2 in AL in slugging percentage (.590)
 #2 in AL in runs scored (126)
 #2 in AL in hits (233)
 #2 in AL in doubles (45)
 #3 in AL in triples (19)
 #4 in AL in home runs (7)
 #6 in AL in stolen bases (41)
 #9 in AL in RBI (83)

Gene Krapp
 #10 in AL in strikeouts (132)

References

External links
1911 Cleveland Naps season at Baseball Reference
Baseball-Almanac
Game log at Baseball-Reference

Cleveland Guardians seasons
Cleveland Naps season
1911 in sports in Ohio